George Edward Pilkington (born 7 November 1981) is an English former professional footballer. During his playing career he was a defender, and made 647 league and cup appearances across a 16-year professional career in the English Football League and National League.

Pilkington started his career at Everton 1998, staying at the club for five years without ever making a first team appearance. In 2002, he had a short loan spell at Exeter City. In 2003, he signed with Port Vale, a club where he spent another five years; this time as a key member of the first team. He was announced as the club's Player of the Year in the 2005–06 season. After making over 250 appearances for the club, he moved to Luton Town. After a slow start due to injuries, Pilkington managed to become an ever-present in the Luton defence, and helped the club to win the 2009 Football League Trophy. He was also voted Player of the Season in the 2009–10 season. He switched to Mansfield Town in June 2012, and won the Conference Premier title with the club in 2012–13. He joined Forest Green Rovers on loan in August 2013, and was loaned out to Macclesfield Town in February 2014. He went on to join Macclesfield permanently in the summer, and was voted Player of the Year in his first three seasons at the club. He also played in the club's defeat at the 2017 FA Trophy Final. He helped the club to win promotion back to the Football League as champions of the National League in 2017–18, before announcing his retirement in June 2018.

Career

Everton
Born in Rugeley, Staffordshire, Pilkington started his career at Stone Dominoes. He later became a trainee at Everton's Finch Farm, but did not make a first-team appearance for the club after turning professional in November 1998. He was sent on loan to Exeter City in November 2002 and played in twelve games, including in the FA Cup against Premier League side Charlton Athletic, which Exeter lost 3–1. He was released by Everton at the end of the 2002–03 season.

Port Vale
Pilkington signed for Brian Horton's Port Vale in June 2003. He became one of the first names in the first eleven during his first season, alongside captain and centre-back partner Sam Collins, making 49 appearances in the 2003–04 campaign. At the end of the season, he and fellow rising star Billy Paynter signed long-term contracts at Vale Park.

On 17 September 2004 he saw his first red card at Brentford, during a 2–0 defeat. However, he was generally productive again in 2004–05, as new manager Martin Foyle selected Pilkington for 48 appearances over all competitions.

The 2005–06 saw Pilkington make 53 appearances, as he became an ever-presence in the league. On 29 April 2006 he scored twice in ten minutes to end his thirty-month goal drought in a 3–1 victory over Chesterfield. He signed a new two-year contract the following month, after which he was named club captain, following the departure of Tony Dinning. Vale fans voted him Port Vale F.C. Player of the Year.

The 2006–07 season was a 'topsy-turvy' campaign, as Pilkington captained his side to a mid-table finish, with a decent League Cup run to boast about – besting Championship sides Preston North End, Queens Park Rangers and Norwich City – before taking Premier League Tottenham Hotspur to extra time. Once again he was an ever-present player, with 53 appearances to his name.

The 2007–08 was a disaster for the club and the player, as new manager Lee Sinnott stripped Pilkington of the captain's armband, and led the club to relegation into League Two. Despite this, Pilkington said he was keen to stay at the club, though it was soon decided that he would leave in the summer. He had made over 250 appearances for the club.

Luton Town
Pilkington joined Luton Town on a free transfer in August 2008. A series of recurring injuries picked up throughout the season limited his playing chances, though he returned for the final run-in of games on 17 March 2009. Pilkington played in the Luton side that beat Scunthorpe United 3–2 in the League Trophy final at Wembley Stadium. However, he suffered relegation for his second successive season as Luton lost their Football League status.

The next season, in which Luton contested their football in the Conference Premier, saw Pilkington play in every league game. He also scored his first goals for the club, accumulating six in total, and won four end-of-season awards, including Player of the Year and Players' Player of the Year. At the end of the season, Pilkington signed a two-year extension to his contract, keeping him at Luton until 2012, and was named as club captain for the 2010–11 season. He played 56 games in the campaign, helping his team to the semi-finals of the FA Trophy and to the Conference play-off final; he scored a penalty in the final's shoot-out, held at the City of Manchester Stadium, but AFC Wimbledon won 4–3 to deny Luton a place in the Football League. Pilkington was given the Players' Player of the Year award, and was also named as man-of-the-match more than other Luton player that season.

He missed the start of the 2011–12 season due to injury, but returned to the first team in October and played 33 league games to help the club to secure the fifth place play-off position. He converted a penalty at the Racecourse Ground to give Luton a 3–2 aggregate victory over Wrexham. He played in the Wembley final itself, but was powerless to stop York City finishing as 2–1 winners.

Mansfield Town
In June 2012, Pilkington signed for Mansfield Town, who finished above Luton in the Conference Premier the previous season, but also lost in the play-offs. Manager Paul Cox described the signing as "a major coup for the club". Mansfield won promotion into the Football League as Conference champions in 2012–13, though Pilkington was the club's "forgotten man" with only four appearances to his name.

In August 2013, Pilkington joined Conference Premier side Forest Green Rovers in a two-month loan deal. He made his debut at The New Lawn on 10 August in an 8–0 win over Hyde. He made a further seven appearances before being recalled following an injury crisis at Mansfield.

Macclesfield Town
On 8 February 2014, Pilkington joined Macclesfield Town on a one-month loan. Fourteen days later he marked his debut for the "Silkmen" with a goal in a 3–2 defeat to Woking at Kingfield Stadium. On 10 March 2014, Pilkington extended his loan spell at Moss Rose for the remainder of the 2013–14 season. He was released by Mansfield at the end of the season, and signed with Macclesfield permanently in July 2014 after manager John Askey described him as a "proper pro".

He missed just two league games of the 2014–15 season as Macclesfield finished one point outside the play-off places, and he was voted the club's Player of the Year. He made 45 appearances across the 2015–16 campaign, as Macclesfield posted a tenth-place finish, and he signed a new one-year contract in May 2016. He also retained his Player of the Year trophy. He made 54 appearances across the 2016–17 campaign, including in the 2017 FA Trophy Final at Wembley Stadium, where Macclesfield were beaten 3–2 by York City. He was named as the club's Player of the Year for a third consecutive season. He made 35 appearances across the 2017–18 campaign as Macclesfield won promotion to the Football League as champions of the National League. He announced his retirement in June 2018.

Coaching career
Pilkington retired from playing in June 2018 to take up the position as first-team coach at League One side Shrewsbury Town, having been recruited by former Macclesfield manager John Askey. He left the club five months later following Askey's dismissal.

Career statistics

Honours
Luton Town
League Trophy: 2008–09

Mansfield Town
Conference Premier: 2012–13

Macclesfield Town
FA Trophy runner-up: 2017
National League: 2017–18

Individual
Port Vale Player of the Year: 2005–06
Conference Premier player of the month: August 2009
Luton Town Player of the Year: 2009–10
Macclesfield Town Player of the Year: 2014–15, 2015–16, 2016–17

References

External links

1981 births
Living people
People from Rugeley
English footballers
Association football defenders
Stone Dominoes F.C. players
Everton F.C. players
Exeter City F.C. players
Port Vale F.C. players
Luton Town F.C. players
Mansfield Town F.C. players
Forest Green Rovers F.C. players
Macclesfield Town F.C. players
English Football League players
National League (English football) players
Association football coaches
Shrewsbury Town F.C. non-playing staff